The 2014 Women's Asian Games Volleyball Tournament was the 14th edition of the event, organized by the Asian governing body, the AVC. It was held in Incheon and Ansan, South Korea from 20 September to 2 October 2014.

Squads

Results
All times are Korea Standard Time (UTC+09:00)

Preliminary round

Group A

|}

Group B

|}

Quarterfinal qualification

|}

Final round

Quarterfinals

 

|}

Semifinals 5th–8th

|}

Semifinals

  
|}

Classification 7th–8th

|}

Classification 5th–6th

|}

Bronze medal match

|}

Gold medal match

|}

Final standing

References
Results

External links
Official website

Women